Paulos Abraham (born 16 July 2002) is a Swedish professional footballer who plays as a forward for FC Groningen. Born to Eritrean migrants in Sweden, Paulos represents Sweden in youth levels.

Career statistics

Club

References

External links
 Career stats & Profile - Voetbal International

2002 births
Living people
Swedish people of Eritrean descent
People from Solna Municipality
Swedish sportspeople of African descent
Swedish men's footballers
Association football forwards
Sweden youth international footballers
IF Brommapojkarna players
AIK Fotboll players
Allsvenskan players
Eredivisie players
Swedish expatriate footballers
Swedish expatriate sportspeople in the Netherlands
Expatriate footballers in the Netherlands
Sportspeople from Stockholm County